The pilum (plural pila) was a javelin commonly used by the Roman army in ancient times.

Design

The weapon had a hard pyramidal tip, but the shank was sometimes made of softer iron. The softness could cause the shank to bend after impact and so render the weapon useless to the enemy. Some believe that the pilum was not meant to bend after impact but was meant to break on impact.  If a pilum struck a shield it might embed itself, the bending of the shank would force the enemy to discard his shield as unusable without removing the pilum, or carry around the shield burdened by the weight of the pilum. Even if the shank did not bend, the pyramidal tip still made it difficult to pull out. However, there were many cases in which the whole shank was hardened, making the pilum more suitable as a close-quarters melee weapon and also making it usable by enemy soldiers.

Although the bending of its shank is commonly seen as an integral part of the weapon's design and as an intentional feature, there is little evidence to suggest that. The most commonly-found artifacts suggest that the pilum was constructed to use the weight of the weapon to cause damage, most likely to be able to impale through armour and reach the enemy soldier's body. The combination of the weapon's weight and the aforementioned pyramidal tip (the design of which would be seen in the Middle Ages in the form of bodkin arrow tips), made the pilum a formidable armour-piercing weapon. If the weapon was meant to be used against armour and to use its mass (as opposed to its speed) to cause damage, the bending of the shank seems to be a beneficial result of its intended use, which is to pierce through layers of armour. That the pilum needed to pierce layers of armour (through the shield, into body armour and past clothing) necessitated a lengthy shank, which was prone to bending. In one work, M.C. Bishop wrote that the momentum of the pilum caused the shank to bend upon impact, and although unintended, that proved a useful characteristic of the weapon. However, a newer work by M. C. Bishop states that pila are "unlikely to bend under their own weight when thrown and striking a target or ground"; rather, it is human intervention such as improper removal of a pilum stuck in a target that is responsible in some way, and Caesar's writings should be interpreted as the pilum bending when soldiers tried to remove them.

Since the pyramidal tip of a pilum was wider than the rest of the shank, once it had penetrated a shield, it left behind a hole larger than the rest of the shank, and it could move through the shield with little resistance, stabbing the soldier behind. The length of the shank and its depth of penetration also made it difficult to pull out of a shield even if it failed to bend. If the bearer of the shield was charging and a pilum penetrated the shield, the end of the heavy shaft of the pilum would hit the ground, holding the shield in place. Some pila had a spike on the end of the shaft, which made it easier to dig into the ground.

Pila come in two models: heavy and light. Pictorial evidence suggests that some versions of the weapon were weighted by a lead ball to increase penetrative power, but archaeological specimens of that design variant are not (so far) known. The earliest known examples of the heavy version of the pilum have barbed heads and their tangs have a figure-eight shape.

Romans also used the pilum as a melee weapon in close-quarters combat. Note pictorial depictions from the Tropaeum Traiani monument, descriptions of  Caesar's troops using javelins as  pikes against the Gauls in Caesar's  Gallic War, Book VII, and descriptions of Caesar's men using javelins to stab at Pompey's cavalry in Plutarch's  Life of Caesar.

The angon was a similar weapon used in late-Roman and post-Roman times.

The origin of the design of the pilum is a matter of contention. Arguments have been proposed which suggest that the design stemmed from ancient Italian tribes or from the Iberian Peninsula. Considering that there are two versions of the pilum (the heavy and the light), the Roman pilum may be descended two different weapons, perhaps from different cultural groups. The two weapon-designs may have coalesced into the form of the typical Roman pilum as it is known today.

Tactics

Legionaries of the late Republic and early Empire often carried two pila, with one sometimes being lighter than the other. Standard tactics called for Roman soldiers to throw one of them (both if time permitted) at the enemy, just before charging to engage with the gladius; however, Alexander Zhmodikov has argued that the Roman infantry could use pila at any stage in the fighting.

The effect of the pilum throw was to disrupt the enemy formation by attrition and by causing gaps to appear in any protective shield wall. The design of the pilum's tip is such that once wedged inside a shield, it is difficult to remove: a shield thus penetrated by a pilum became very awkward to wield, and was usually discarded. This resulted in the aforementioned gaps in the protective shield wall, which could then favor the short gladius in tight hand-to-hand mêlée.

Pila could also be used in hand-to-hand combat; one documented instance of this occurred at the Siege of Alesia, and another during Mark Antony's Parthian campaign. Additionally, pila could be employed as a thrusting implement and a barrier against cavalry charges. Some pila had small hand-guards, to protect the wielder if he intended to use it as a melee weapon, but it does not appear that this was common.

Vegetius' commentary

The Roman writer Vegetius, in his work De re militari, wrote:

And later in the same work:

It may be argued that a short iron shaft has very few confirmations from archaeology. Vegetius wrote about a one-foot iron shaft because at Vegetius' time the pilum had disappeared and been replaced by similar shorter weapons such as the plumbatae and the spiculum.

Results of experimental archaeology

Thanks in part to experimental archaeology, it is generally believed that the design of the pilum evolved to be armour-piercing: the pyramidal head would punch a small hole through an enemy shield allowing the thin shank to pass through and penetrate far enough to wound the man behind it. The thick wooden shaft provided the weight behind the punch.

In one description, one of the two iron nails that held the iron shaft in place was replaced with a weak wooden pin that would break on impact causing the shaft to twist sideways. Gaius Marius is sometimes given credit for that modification.

Gallery

See also

 Hasta
 Lance
 Lancea
 Pole weapon
 Projectile
 Roman military personal equipment
 Spear
 Verutum

Citations

General and cited references 

 Connolly, Peter. Greece and Rome at War. Reprint: Greenhill Books, 1998 .
 Connolly, Peter. "The pilum from Marius to Nero: a reconsideration of its development and function", Journal of Roman Military Equipment Studies, vol. 12/13, 2001/2, pp. 1–8.

External links

 Ross Cowan, The Samnite Pilum
 Ross Cowan, Etruscan and Gallic Pila
 The Pilum - The Roman Spear, Caerleon's Roman Legion
 Lance / Spear / Pilum / Catapult points, www.romanlegions.info
 Archaeological discovery of a pilum, Ecomuseum de Cap de Cavalleria.

Ancient Roman legionary equipment
Ancient weapons
Javelins
Personal weapons
Roman spears
Throwing spears